Abacetus cameronus is a species of ground beetle in the subfamily Pterostichinae. It was described by Henry Walter Bates in 1886.

References

cameronus
Beetles described in 1886